Eustace Folville (died 1347 aged almost 60) is credited with killing/assassinating the unpopular Sir Roger de Beler, Baron of the Exchequer and henchman of the despised Hugh le Despencer and ineffective King Edward II. He was the most active member of the Folville Gang who engaged in acts of vigilantism and outlawry in Leicestershire in the early 1300s, often on the behalf of others.

Folville family
Eustace was the second out of seven sons of Sir John Folville, a respectable member of the gentry who acted on many occasions as a Commissioner or Knighe Shire for both Rutland and Leicestershire. Eustace's elder brother, also Sir John  Folville, inherited all of his father's lands in 1309 and kept out of most (but not all) of the law-breaking of his younger brothers. More recent research shows Farnham's Folville pedigree is flawed. Sir John de Folville and Eustace (along with their other siblings) were the issue of Sir Eustace (who died shortly before 1284) by Dame Alice.

Background
Upon the death of the well respected King Edward I, aka the "Hammer of the Scots", he was succeeded by his son Edward II who did not inherit his father's abilities. Edward II promoted a young French knight called Piers Gaveston ahead of the existing aristocracy and his corruption and abusive nature meant that relations between the King and his subjects soon broke down. Gaveston was exiled but returned and was executed by Thomas, 2nd Earl of Lancaster in 1312.

Gaveston was soon replaced in the affections of the king by another knight, Hugh Despenser the Younger. Despenser's greed and corruption became rampant and relations between him and the baronage disintegrated and resulted in the Despenser War of 1321–22, led by the Marcher Lords Roger Mortimer and Humphrey de Bohun. This culminated in the Battle of Boroughbridge on 16 March 1322 which was won by the King and Despenser and saw Gaveston's killer, Thomas, 2nd Earl of Lancaster (King Edward's cousin), himself executed.

Some rebels were imprisoned such as Roger Mortimer (who escaped to France in August 1323) and Robert de Holland, 1st Baron Holand. Others fled and engaged in outlawry; Sir William Trussell (who was to later become the Speaker of the House of Commons and was to oversee Edward's abdication) led a rebel group that raided in Somerset and Dorset in August 1322.

As the injustices continued, and the effects of the Great Famine of 1315–22 lingered, discontent remained.  Despenser and his father Hugh le Despenser, 1st Earl of Winchester were rewarded with lands that had belonged to Thomas, Earl of Lancaster, including those in Leicestershire. On 14 Mar 1323 Roger de Beler, Baron of the Exchequer, Richard de Willoughby and William de Gosefeld were issued with arrest warrants for Sir William Trussell, William his son, Roger la Zouch (son of Sir Roger la Zouch, Lord of Lubbesthorpe), Ralph his brother, Robert de Holland, 1st Baron Holand and others who were accused by Hugh le Despenser of stealing horses, oxen, pigs, sheep and swans from his parks in Leicestershire. The warrant was reissued in 1324 alongside similar ones that dealt with rioting against Dispenser in Warwickshire, Staffordshire and Worcestershire by other rebels.

Sir William Trussell was forced to flee to France where he joined Roger Mortimer and plotted revenge against the Despencers and the King. Queen Isabella joined them in 1325 and embarked upon an affair with Mortimer, having been estranged from Edward II since he had left her dangerously unprotected from the Scottish in 1322.

By January 1326 English supporters of Isabella, Mortimer and Trussell, perhaps including the la Zouches, were assembling and equipping troops in preparation for an approaching invasion.

The Folville Gang

The Slaying of Roger Beler 1326
Much crime, including murder, extortion and kidnapping was committed throughout the gang's career.

Rehabilitation
A year after the kidnap of Willoughby, Eustace was serving in the armies of Edward III against the Scottish. He may well have fought at the Halidon Hill. In recognition of this military service, Eustace received another full pardon for his crimes. He was in combat again in 1337 and 1338, in Scotland and Flanders respectively. He finally died in 1347, a member of the council of the abbot of Crowland, having stood trial for none of the charges lodged against him. He is buried at St Mary's church, Ashby Folville. His monument has been badly damaged: a Victorian description states that 'the fragments of his helmet form the only part of his funeral achievement now remaining'.

Assessment

Eustace Folville faced such little resistance in his lifetime, and suffered no form of legal penalty, despite being known as a habitual offender for two decades. During this time he went wholly unpunished, unlike his unfortunate brother Richard. Two factors may explain Folville's apparent good fortune. Firstly, the political turbulence of the 1320s worked in his favour, particularly in the case of his worst crime, the murder of Beler. Beler had been closely connected to the Despensers: he was appointed attorney to Hugh Despenser the Younger in 1322, and used the revenues of confiscated lands to curry favour with the family.

Secondly, and most importantly, there is a widespread perception that Eustace and others like him were basically honest and forthright, at least more so than the authorities that pursued them. This would mean that the justices and their clerks, reliant as they were on testimonies from local people, would find their job extremely difficult in the Folville's home territory. As  E.L.G. Stones  notes, complaints along these lines are frequently made by the trailbaston and other commissions: 'in all these things they are aided and abetted by local people, who incite them to their evil deeds and shield them after they are done'. While these laments might seem to excuse the commissions' own failures, there is undoubtedly some truth to them. After all, a tip-off from a local source allowed the Folvilles and Cotterels to elude capture in the Peak District.

This popular support seems to be rooted in a sense that the Folvilles were allies of the common people, combating the crooked establishment which oppressed them. There is at least some justification for this view. Eustace's two principal victims were certainly highly corrupt individuals. Beler used his office to seize land and siphon money to his patrons, and his murder should be regarded less as a crime by the Folvilles alone, and more a conspiracy by several Leicestershire landowners. Eustace's accomplices were members of the Halewell and Zouche families, which suggests a breadth of ill-feeling against Sir Roger, going well beyond any one group. Willoughby was no more popular. In 1340 he was targeted by a second gang, who trapped him in Thurcaston castle. He was later imprisoned by Edward III on charges of corruption, indicted by several juries across the country, and forced to pay 1200 marks for the king's pardon. Eustace was respected as an opponent of such figures, even if this opposition was not his primary motive.

Later reputation
For the generations after Eustace's death, the positive view of the Folville gang only increased. In later sources they are not merely regarded as law-breakers, but agents of an unofficial law, outside human legislation and less susceptible to abuse.

In William Langland's (a Midlander himself) Piers Plowman (c.1377-9), he sees them as instruments of the divine order. While he is scathing  about popular veneration of 'Robyn Hood and Ralph Erl of Chestre', he speaks approvingly of 'Folvyles lawes'. The crimes of the family are presented as correctives to the 'false' legal establishment, and the 'Folvyles' themselves are listed among the 'tresors' that Grace has given to combat 'Antecrist'. Langland states:

"Therefore, said Grace, before I go, I will give you treasure and weaponry to fight with when Antichrist attacks you"

and

"And some to ride and some to recover what unrightfuly was won;"
"He instructed men to win it back again through strength of hands"
"And to fetch if from false men with Folvilles Laws"

Henry Knighton is no less sympathetic. He portrays Bellere and Willoughby as entirely legitimate targets: Willoughby's ransom is reduced to a less avaricious 90 marks, while Bellere becomes the aggressor of his killers, not only 'heaping threats and injustices' on to his neighbours but coveting their 'possessions'. The kidnap of Willoughby is portrayed as a direct conflict between the two codes represented by the outlaws and the justice: Sir Richard is abducted as punishment for trespassing on the territory of a rival order, specifically 'because of the trailbaston commissions of 1331'.

For his contemporaries and near-contemporaries, Eustace Folville was clearly more than an acquisitive thug. He was something closer to an enforcer of 'God's law and the common custom, which was different from the state's or the lord's law, but nevertheless a social order'.

See also
Bulla Felix
Rob Roy MacGregor

Notes

References

Bibliography

External links
 Folville Tomb (possibly Eustace) in St Mary's, Ashby Folvill

Medieval English criminals
English outlaws
Recipients of English royal pardons
Year of birth unknown
14th-century English people
Medieval thieves
People from the Borough of Melton
14th-century criminals